Dartanyon Crockett (born May 22, 1991) is a competitive Judo athlete for the United States.  Crockett is legally blind.  He won the bronze medal in the men's 90 kg division at both the 2012 Summer Paralympics in London in London and the 2016 Summer Paralympics in Rio. He attends Pikes Peak Community College, where he is majoring in Social Work.  He is a former wrestler as well as a member of Team USA.
Additionally, Crockett recently joined UNICEF Kid Power as a brand ambassador Kid Power Champion.

References

1991 births
Living people
American male judoka
Paralympic judoka of the United States
Judoka at the 2012 Summer Paralympics
Judoka at the 2016 Summer Paralympics
Medalists at the 2012 Summer Paralympics
Medalists at the 2016 Summer Paralympics
Paralympic medalists in judo
Paralympic bronze medalists for the United States
Medalists at the 2011 Parapan American Games